Borovichene is a village in Petrich Municipality, in Blagoevgrad Province, Bulgaria. As of 2013, there were 48 inhabitants.

References

Villages in Blagoevgrad Province